Kevin Russel Tate (8 April 1943 – 22 January 2018) was a New Zealand soil chemist, ecologist and climate scientist.

Early life and family
Born in Lower Hutt on 8 April 1943, Tate was the son of Dudley Tate and Hazel Winifred Tate (née Jackson-Hughes). He was educated at Hutt Valley High School from 1956.

Scientific career
Tate studied chemistry at Victoria University of Wellington, graduating BSc in 1964, and MSc the following year. His master's thesis was titled A study of the dealdolisation of diacetone alcohol. Tate then completed a PhD on decarboxylation kinetics and mechanisms under Robert Walker Hay at Victoria, before moving to Soil Bureau, a branch of the Department of Scientific and Industrial Research (DSIR) in the Hutt Valley. In 1992, DSIR was dissolved and Soil Bureau became Landcare Research, a Crown Research Institute, and he moved with it to Palmerston North, on the campus of Massey University.

Much of Tate's early research involved the storage and cycling of phosphorus and carbon in soils, particularly in economically important New Zealand grasslands and native forests. Later work focused on carbon cycling and sequestration, particularly as climate change became an issue and the question of how soils and soil biota could impact atmospheric carbon dioxide levels became relevant.

Tate also contributed his soil chemistry knowledge to other research topics at Soil Bureau / Landcare, including sand dune rehabilitation, restoration of pasture after topsoil removal and understanding tussock grasslands. Many papers were coauthored with people including Des J. Ross, C.W. Feltham, Benny K.G. Theng, R.H. Newman, Neal A. Scott, Surinder Saggar, Paul C.D. Newton, Troy Baisden, Aroon Parshotam, David A. Wardle and Gregor W. Yeates.

Retirement in 2005 did not stop Tate working on his science. One of his last works was editing Microbial Biomass, a 2017 volume on soil and ecosystem microbial processes.

Tate died in Palmerston North on 22 January 2018.

Honours and awards
In 1995, Tate was elected a Fellow of the Royal Society of New Zealand, the peak science organisation in New Zealand. He was also elected to fellowships of the New Zealand Institute of Chemistry and the New Zealand Society of Soil Science.

In 2005, Tate was awarded the Marsden Medal by the New Zealand Association of Scientists for "contribution to, and leadership of, research into ecosystem processes and climate change [spanning] four decades."

Selected works

References

External links
 

1943 births
2018 deaths
People from Lower Hutt
People educated at Hutt Valley High School
Victoria University of Wellington alumni
New Zealand chemists
New Zealand soil scientists
People associated with Department of Scientific and Industrial Research (New Zealand)
Fellows of the Royal Society of New Zealand